USS John M. Bermingham (DE-530) was an Evarts class destroyer escort constructed for the United States Navy during World War II. She was sent off into North Atlantic Ocean waters to protect convoys and other ships from German submarines and fighter aircraft. She performed escort and antisubmarine operations in battle areas before being retired and subsequently scrapped.

Namesake
John Michael Bermingham was born on 5 July 1905 in New York City. He graduated from the United States Naval Academy in 1929. In 1940 he was assigned as Executive Officer of the destroyer  and at the outbreak of the war in the Pacific his tour of duty on Stewart was finished. On 10 Dec 1941, Lt Bermingham was in Manila awaiting transport back to the United States witnessed the attack on the US Naval Base, Cavite. During the first Japanese attack on Cavite 10 December, Peary's commanding officer was wounded and the executive officer was killed. Lt Martin M. Kiovisto assumed command. Lt. Bermingham (was promoted to Lieutenant Commander on 06 Jan 1942 by ALNAV 4) received orders from the Commander in Chief (CINC) Asiatic Fleet dated 11 Dec 1941 to assume command of the Peary. The ship was assigned to offshore patrol and came under heavy air attack many times in the days to come. Only brilliant seamanship during bombing and torpedo attacks 26 and 27 December saved her from destruction. Despite the Japanese air superiority, Bermingham succeeded in bringing his ship to Darwin, Australia, to operate with Allied forces attempting to hold Malay Barrier. Peary operated with the cruiser  in February, and was anchored at Darwin when the Japanese attacked with bombers on 19 February 1942. Bermingham got his ship underway and attempted to maneuver in the restricted waters; but, despite antiaircraft fire, his ship was hit with five bombs. Bermingham and about 80 of his crew went down with the ship. He was posthumously awarded the Navy Cross.

Construction and commissioning
The ship was laid down by Boston Navy Yard on 14 October 1943; launched on 17 November 1943; sponsored by Mrs. J. M. Bermingham, widow of Lieutenant Commander Bermingham; and commissioned 8 April 1944.

Service history

World War II
The new destroyer escort conducted shakedown off Bermuda and arrived Charleston, South Carolina on 9 June to begin her vital convoy escort duty. Departing on 14 June, she escorted the ships to the English Channel; and, after steaming to Belfast on 23 July, she returned to Boston, Massachusetts on 2 August 1944. She then underwent further training in Casco Bay before arriving New York on 28 August to join an unusual convoy.

Bermingham sailed on 19 September with other escort vessels to convoy a large group of Army tugs and barges for use in the important captured ports of northern France. During the arduous crossing, rough weather claimed several tugs and many of the vitally-needed harbor barges. Only a heroic effort on the part of escorting ships brought the remainder of the convoy to safety at Plymouth on 20 October. After a week of searching for straggling barges, the ship joined a return convoy and arrived New York on 21 November.

After training, Bermingham was assigned to regular convoy runs between American ports and Oran, Algeria, in support of the giant land offensive underway in Europe. She made three voyages to Oran in the months that followed, arriving New York on 29 May 1945. Her mission in Europe completed with the fall of the Axis, the ship arrived on Miami, Florida, 20 July for duty as a school ship at the Naval Training Center.

Bermingham sailed to Charleston, South Carolina after V-J Day, arrived on 9 September, and decommissioned on 12 October. She was scrapped in March 1946.

References

External links
NavSource Online: Destroyer Escort Photo Archive – USS John M. Bermingham (DE-530)

Evarts-class destroyer escorts
Ships built in Boston
1943 ships
World War II frigates and destroyer escorts of the United States